Mausam may refer to:

People
 Mausam Khatri, Indian freestyle wrestler
 Mausam Noor, Indian politician

Geography
 Mausam River, in Nashik District, Maharashtra, India

Arts and entertainment
 Mausam (1975 film)
 Mausam (2011 film)
 Mausam (TV series), Pakistani drama
 Mausam (JoSH album)
 Mausam (Sonu Nigam album)

other usage 

 Project Mausam, Indian cultural and economic project to connect countries on the Indian Ocean